Henline Mountain is a mountain located in the Opal Creek Wilderness in the Willamette National Forest. The mountain lies about 10 miles northeast of the town of Mill City. Henline Mountain stands 4,644 ft above sea level (1,415 m). The name of the mountain comes from a 19th-century settler. The mountain is most well known for the hike up the mountain which has views of Mt. Jefferson. Henline Mountain shares its name with nearby Henline Falls.

References

Willamette National Forest
Mountains of Oregon
Mountains of Marion County, Oregon